Nenad Stojković (born 26 May 1956) is a Serbian football manager and former player.

Club career
During his 18-year professional career, Stojković played for Partizan (1974–1984), Monaco (1984–1986), Montpellier (1986–1988), Mulhouse (1988–1990), Nancy (1990–1991), and Amiens (1991–1992), amassing over 500 league appearances.

International career
At international level, Stojković represented Yugoslavia between 1977 and 1984, collecting 32 caps and scoring once. He appeared at the 1982 FIFA World Cup and UEFA Euro 1984, playing the full 90 minutes in all three of his team's games in each tournament.

Post-playing career
After hanging up his boots, Stojković had a brief spell as manager of Championnat National side Cannes in early 2003. He also served as manager of Serbian League Belgrade club Radnički Obrenovac in late 2010.

Career statistics

Honours
Partizan
 Yugoslav First League: 1975–76, 1977–78, 1982–83
 Mitropa Cup: 1978
Monaco
 Coupe de France: 1984–85
Montpellier
 French Division 2: 1986–87

References

External links
 
 
 

1982 FIFA World Cup players
Amiens SC players
AS Cannes managers
AS Monaco FC players
AS Nancy Lorraine players
Association football defenders
Expatriate footballers in France
Expatriate footballers in Monaco
FC Mulhouse players
FK Partizan players
Kosovo Serbs
Ligue 1 players
Ligue 2 players
Montpellier HSC players
People from Prizren
Serbia and Montenegro expatriate football managers
Serbia and Montenegro expatriate sportspeople in France
Serbia and Montenegro football managers
Serbian football managers
UEFA Euro 1984 players
Yugoslav expatriate footballers
Yugoslav expatriate sportspeople in France
Yugoslav expatriate sportspeople in Monaco
Yugoslav First League players
Yugoslav footballers
Yugoslavia international footballers
Yugoslavia under-21 international footballers
1956 births
Living people